Delta Lake State Park is a  New York state park located on a peninsula extending from the southeast shore of Delta Lake in the Town of Western, in Oneida County, New York, United States. It is located off New York State Route 46, southwest of Westernville, east of Lee, New York and north of Rome, New York

History 
The peninsula that today contains Delta Lake State Park was created when the Mohawk River was impounded in 1908 to form Delta Lake, a reservoir intended to supply water to the New York State Barge Canal.

Facilities 
The park offers a beach, picnic tables and pavilions, a playground, a food concession, trails for hiking and bike riding, cross-country skiing, snowmobiling and ice fishing, recreation programs, a boat launch, a campground with 101 tent and trailer sites, showers and a dump station.

See also 
 List of New York state parks

References

External links 
 New York State Parks – Delta Lake State Park
 Delta Lake State Park map

State parks of New York (state)
Parks in Oneida County, New York